Belem Guerrero Méndez (born March 8, 1974 in Mexico City) is a Mexican former road and track cyclist who represented Mexico at the 2004 Summer Olympics in Athens where she won a silver medal in the Women's Points Race.

She won the points race gold and the bronze medals in 3000m Individual Pursuit and road race during the 1998 Central American and Caribbean Games, but failed the doping control with Pseudoephedrine and her medals were stripped.

Palmarès

1997
3rd Points race, UCI Track Cycling World Championships

1998
2nd Points race, UCI Track Cycling World Championships

1999
2nd Points race, Round 5, Track World Cup, Cali

2001
3rd Points race, UCI Track Cycling World Championships
2nd Pan American Championships, Road, Medellin

2002
1st Pan American Championships, Road, Quito
1st Pan American Championships, Track, Individual pursuit, Quito
1st Pan American Championships, Track, Scratch, Quito
2nd Pan American Championships, Track, Points race, Quito
3rd Stage 4, Redlands Bicycle Classic
3rd Scratch race, Round 1, Track World Cup, Monterrey
1st Points race, Round 1, Track World Cup, Monterrey

2004
3rd Points race, UCI Track Cycling World Championships
2nd Points race, Round 1, Track World Cup, Moscow
3rd Points race, Round 3, Track World Cup, Manchester
2nd Points race, Summer Olympics

2007
1st Pan American Championships, Track, Points race, Valencia
2nd Pan American Games, Road, Rio de Janeiro
3rd Pan American Games, Points race, Rio de Janeiro

2008
3rd Copa Federacion Venezolana de Ciclismo
3rd Pan American Championships, Road
3rd Stage 4, Vuelta Ciclista Femenina a el Salvador, Lourdes

References

External links

1974 births
Living people
Mexican female cyclists
Mexican track cyclists
Doping cases in cycling
Olympic cyclists of Mexico
Cyclists at the 1995 Pan American Games
Cyclists at the 1996 Summer Olympics
Cyclists at the 1999 Pan American Games
Cyclists at the 2000 Summer Olympics
Cyclists at the 2003 Pan American Games
Cyclists at the 2004 Summer Olympics
Cyclists at the 2007 Pan American Games
Olympic silver medalists for Mexico
Sportspeople from Mexico City
Olympic medalists in cycling
Pan American Games silver medalists for Mexico
Pan American Games bronze medalists for Mexico
Medalists at the 2004 Summer Olympics
Pan American Games medalists in cycling
Central American and Caribbean Games gold medalists for Mexico
Central American and Caribbean Games silver medalists for Mexico
Central American and Caribbean Games bronze medalists for Mexico
Competitors at the 2002 Central American and Caribbean Games
Central American and Caribbean Games medalists in cycling
Medalists at the 1995 Pan American Games
Medalists at the 2007 Pan American Games
20th-century Mexican women
21st-century Mexican women
Competitors at the 1998 Central American and Caribbean Games